A City Is Beautiful at Nightis a 2006 French drama film directed by Richard Bohringer.

Plot 
The film is based on the eponymous book by Richard Bohringer, an autobiography mixing reality and imagination, Africa and travel, drugs and alcohol, actor and musician, family and love, Richard is revealed..

Cast 

 Richard Bohringer as Richard
 Romane Bohringer as Romane
 Robinson Stévenin as Paulo
 Luc Thuillier as Rolland
 Gabrielle Lazure as Régine
 Christian Morin as Régine's Husband
 Bertrand Richard as Bertrand
 Olivier Monteils as Olivier
 Pierre Marie as Pierre
 Arnaud Frankfurt as Arnaud
 Kader Ayd as Gambler
 Annie Cordy as The HLM Grandma
 Annie Girardot as The Grandmother
 Sonia Rolland as The Transsexual Dancer
 Jacques Spiesser as The Manager
 Farid Chopel as The Blind Berber
 Daniel Duval as The Cop
 Paul Personne as himself

References

External links 

2006 films
French drama films
2006 drama films
2000s French films